Fred Keup (born 15 May 1980 in Luxembourg City) is a Luxembourgish politician ( ADR ) and a member of parliament at the Chamber of Deputies (Luxembourg) (from October 14, 2020).

Life 
Keup grew up in Kehlen and currently lives in Mamer. He is married and the father of two children. After his secondary school education at the Lycée Michel Rodange, he studied geography at the University of Strasbourg in France. From 2003 onwards he had taught geography and civil education in high school.

Referendum 2015 
In the 2015 Luxembourg constitutional referendum, Fred Keup and a friend of his, Steve Kodesch, started a Facebook page publicly opposing the government and much of the establishment's wish to give foreigners the right to vote in the national elections. As the page become very popular, they established a political pressure group called "Nee2015". During the campaign, Fred Keup was seen as the spokesman of the "no camp" (fr: Porte-parole du camp du "non") and "the leading head of the no campaign". A highlight of the intense campaign was a public debate moderated by Radio RTL Luxembourg between Fred Keup and Laura Zuccoli. After the referendum (which ended with 79% against the right for foreigners to vote in national elections), the group renamed itself “Wee2050” with a focus on supporting the Luxembourgish language, which they believe are endangered, and the rapid economic growth in Luxembourg. Keup has also expressed his support for the Monarchy of Luxembourg. Fred Keup locates himself as a representative of the political center (“Vertieder vun der politescher Mëtt”) and rightly so, according to the political scientist Raphael Kies from the University of Luxembourg.

Politics 
In the 2018 Luxembourg general election, Fred Keup ran on the ADR's list in the Southern voting district and received the third most votes. After the first elected Gaston Gibéryen declared his wish to retire early, Keup replaced him at the Chamber of Deputies (Luxembourg) on October 14, 2020.

Other interests 
Fred Keup is the president of the soccer club FC Kehlen and was a board member of the Actioun Lëtzebuergesch .

References 

Alternative Democratic Reform Party politicians
Luxembourgian politicians
Members of the Chamber of Deputies (Luxembourg)
1980 births
University of Strasbourg alumni
Living people